Flat Rock is an unincorporated community in Caldwell County, Kentucky, United States.

Flat Rock was named for the natural outcrop which surrounded the settlement.

References

Unincorporated communities in Caldwell County, Kentucky
Unincorporated communities in Kentucky